Anshul Ketan Kothari (born 17 December 1989) is an Indian competitive swimmer who has represented India in Commonwealth Games and Asian Games.

Early life and education 
Kothari was diagnosed with a severe flat feet condition at age of 4. Kothari has done his graduation from Sardar Vallabbhai National Institute of Technology, Surat and an MBA from the Indian School of Business, Hyderabad.

Swimming career 
Kothari has represented India at Commonwealth Games 2010, Asian Games 2010, Asian Games 2014 and Asian Games 2018.

19th Commonwealth Games 2010 
Kothari represented India at the Commonwealth Games held at New Delhi.  He swam in 50,100 m freestyle and also 4 × 100 m freestyle events. He swam the third leg in the 4 × 100 m freestyle relay which made history by qualifying for the finals for the first time in the history.  The Indian 4 × 100 m freestyle relay quartet stood 6th in the finals.

National Championships 2011 
Kothari in the year 2011 ended a two decade gold drought for his state Gujarat by finishing at 1st position in the 50 m freestyle event.

34th National Games 2011 
At the 34th National Games 2011 held at Ranchi, Jharkhand he won a total of two individual medals.

Asian Age Group Championships 
Kothari was part of the gold medal winning teams in 4 × 100 m Freestyle Relay at Asian Age group Championships in both 2011 and 2015 editions.

17th Asian Games 2014 
He swam in 50 m freestyle, 50 m butterfly and also the 4 × 100 m freestyle relay events. He finished at 14th position in 50
 m Butterfly and 20th position in 50 m Freestyle. In the 4x100 freestyle relay, Kothari swam the lead off leg and the team finished at 6th position in the finals.

70th Senior National Aquatics Championships 2016 
Kothari, along with the Gujarat swimming team won the gold medal and set a national record in 4 x 50m Mixed Medley Relay event with the timing of 01:53.42.

Kothari also won a gold medal in 50m Butterfly with the timing of 00:24.93, silver medal in 100m Freestyle with the timing of 00:51.94, silver medal in 50m Freestyle with the timing of 00:23.31, and bronze medal in 4x50m mixed freestyle relay event.

12th South Asian Games 2016 
Kothari won a gold medal in 4 × 100 m medley relay, silver medal in 50 m butterfly, and silver medal in 4 × 100 m freestyle relay.

9th Asian Age Group Championship, Uzbekistan 2017 
Kothari won a silver medal in 50m butterfly event with the timing of 00:24.84, and a bronze medal in 50m freestyle event with the timing of 00:23.28.

He also won a silver medal in 4x100 Mixed FS Relay event (along with his teammates Sahil Chopra, Damini Gowda, and Shivani Kataria), and a bronze medal in 4X200m Relay FS event (along with his teammates Avinash Mani, Sahil Chopra, Sajan Prakash).

18th Asian Games 2018 
Kothari participated in the 4x100 m freestyle relay, Kothari swam the second leg and the team finished at 8th position in the finals creating a new Indian record in the morning heats.

References 

1989 births
Indian male swimmers
Living people
Swimmers from Maharashtra
Swimmers at the 2010 Asian Games
Swimmers at the 2014 Asian Games
Swimmers at the 2018 Asian Games
Asian Games competitors for India
South Asian Games gold medalists for India
South Asian Games silver medalists for India
South Asian Games medalists in swimming
Swimmers at the 2010 Commonwealth Games
Commonwealth Games competitors for India
20th-century Indian people
21st-century Indian people